Royal blood, or royal descent, indicates lineal descent from a monarch

Royal Blood can refer to:

 Royal Blood (band), a British rock duo formed in 2011
 Royal Blood (album), 2014 album by band above
 Royal Blood (Doctor Who), a 2015 novel
 Royal Blood (film), a 1916 American silent film starring Oliver Hardy
 Gemfire, a 1991 fantasy video game released in Japan as Royal Blood